Beatties is a small unincorporated community in the town of Stratford in Coos County, New Hampshire, United States.

References

Unincorporated communities in Coös County, New Hampshire
Unincorporated communities in New Hampshire